Gerald Armond Gallego (July 17, 1946 – July 18, 2002) and Charlene Adell Gallego (née Williams; born October 10, 1956) were two American serial killers and rapists who were active mainly in Sacramento, California between 1978 and 1980. They murdered at least ten victims, mostly teenagers, often kept as sex slaves before killing them.

Perpetrators

Gerald Armond Gallego
Gerald Armond Gallego was born on July 17, 1946 in Sacramento, California. His mother was a sex worker, while his estranged father was a criminal who in 1955 became the first man executed in the Mississippi gas chamber, for the killing of a police officer during a prison escape. During his formative years, his mother and her multiple boyfriends beat him constantly. Several of her clients even sexually abused him. He often begged to be hugged and was frequently left unclean and hungry. At the age of 10, Gallego was arrested for his first known felony offense—robbing a neighbour's home. This was the start of his criminal career. He had twenty-three arrests and served prison time after being convicted of robbery prior to his murders.

Gallego worked as a bartender and truck driver. He was married a total of seven times, including two marriages to the same woman,  but he would often abandon his partners when they ran out of money. When Gerald was 12, he sexually abused a 6-year-old girl which resulted in him being sentenced to a California youth authority 
facility, and would during his adulthood sexually molest his own daughter as well as one of her friends. He was still married to a previous wife when he married Charlene.

Charlene Adell Gallego 
Charlene Adell Gallego (née Williams) was born on October 10, 1956 in Stockton, California. She was a smart, shy child from a supportive home. Her father was a well-known businessman who served as the vice president of a chain of supermarkets. As part of their professional lives, he and his wife frequently travelled. After Charlene's mother was severely injured in a car accident, Charlene took over her mother's responsibilities and started accompanying her father on his business travels, where she was frequently lauded by her father's clients for being an educated and articulate youngster.

The trajectory of her life began to change when, as a young adult, she started using drugs and alcohol. Because of her overly flirty behaviour with her male co-workers, Charlene was despised at work and developed a reputation as a nymphomaniac. Charlene wed a wealthy young man who was addicted to heroin who asserted that Charlene was desperate for a threesome with him, her, and a prostitute because she was enamoured with lesbian sex. The marriage fell apart and they divorced because Charlene's first husband also detested the fact that Charlene's parents interfered in their relationship. Charlene's next husband was a soldier who Charlene described as a "mother's boy".She became bored with him, and they separated. When Charlene asked whether they might have sex with his wife, the married man with whom she was having an affair ended their relationship quickly. She attempted suicide after the breakup but survived. It was not long after this that she met Gerald.

Relationship
On September 10, 1977, Charlene met Gerald at a poker club in Sacramento, California. Within a week of their first encounter, Charlene moved in with Gerald. Charlene acted as the sexually subservient partner in their sadomasochistic relationship. Although Charlene later claimed in court that she detested the painful experience, Gerald engaged in rough intercourse with her and particularly enjoyed sodomising her. Charlene allegedly became enamoured by his machismo and started partaking in his deviant fantasies.

After they had been living together for a few months, Gerald brought home a 16-year-old exotic dancer to Charlene, and they had a threesome together. He made sure the two women did not touch each other and only touched him. But afterwards when he got home from work, he discovered that the two women were having sex alone. He beat Charlene after throwing the dancer out an open window in wrath. Then he refused to have intercourse with her, claiming he had lost his libido and had become impotent. Charlene felt Gerald was sleeping with his patrons when he was working as a bartender because he had lost interest in having a sexual relationship with her. After a year, he admitted that he required a pair of sex slaves to keep him excited. Charlene was asked to find them, and she obliged out of respect for him and to gratify her own intense lesbian cravings.

Victims

Sandra Kaye Butler
16-year-old Sandra Kaye Butler was last seen in Sparks, Nevada on June 26, 1978. At Fourth and Greenbrae Streets, directly across from her family's apartment, she was last seen making her way to the Greenbrae Shopping Center. She has not been seen or heard from since. She was seen as a runaway at the time of her disappearance, thus authorities took minimal action to track her down.

Authorities believe that Sandra was Charlene and Gerald's first victim. On June 24, 1979, the Gallegos' would kidnap two adolescent females from the Sparks fairgrounds. Sandra had also been given permission by her mother to ride her bike to the Reno Rodeo at the fairgrounds on the day she vanished. It was known that the Gallegos' were present there on that day. Gerald and Charlene were never interviewed by the police who were investigating Butler's disappearance. Neither ever confessed or were convicted of Sandra's supposed murder. Butler's remains have not been located, and there is suspicion of foul play.

Rhonda Scheffler and Kippi Vaught 
Two adolescents, Kippi Vaught, 16, and Rhonda Scheffler, 17, vanished from a Sacramento mall on September 10, 1978. Charlene tricked them into going to the back of the couple's van as they were both shopping at Sacramento's Country Club Plaza, where the pair then kidnapped them. The girls were restrained by Gerald after he threatened them with a firearm. The two victims were then repeatedly assaulted by him all through the night in Baxter, California. 

The following day, the Gerald and Charlene drove to Sloughhouse, California where Gerald ordered Scheffler and Vaught out of the van. Then, after forcing them to cross a field to a ditch, he struck Vaught with a tyre iron before swinging around and beating Scheffler. Finally, he pulled out a 25-caliber pistol and shot each girl once in the head. Vaught moved and made an attempt to flee as Gerald was leaving because the gunshot had only lightly grazed her skull. She was killed when he went back and fired three more shots into her head. Charlene would later tell a cellmate how ecstatic she felt during this particular crime.

Brenda Judd and Sandra Colley 
On June 24, 1979, 14-year-old Brenda Judd and 13-year-old Sandra Colley were abducted from the Washoe County Fair in Reno, Nevada. Both were persuaded to enter the Gallegos' van with the promise of earning money by distributing flyers. On I-80, Charlene took the van northeast of Reno and as she watched in the rear-view mirror, Gerald repeatedly sexually assaulted the two young girls in the back of the van. Charlene then parked their van in the remote Humboldt Sink area.

Over the next couple of hours, Gerald rested and watched Charlene force the girls to perform sexual acts on each other. Colley was then dragged towards a dry stream bed by Gerald after he removed a shovel from under their van's seat and yanked her out of the car. He then crept up behind Colley and repeatedly struck her in the head with a shovel. Charlene would later recall in court the assault, describing it as "a loud splat like a flat rock hitting mud, and the girl sank to her knees and slowly toppled over on her face." After killing Judd, Gerald dug a large pit, placed the two girls' naked bodies inside of it, and covered it with a rock. 

The teenagers were listed as runaways for four years until Charlene confessed to their murders during the 1982 trial. Their remains were not found and identified until twenty years later in November 1999 by a tractor operator.

Stacy Ann Redican and Karen Chipman-Twiggs 
On the morning of April 24, 1980, Gerald awoke Charlene and demanded, "I want a girl! Get up!" After some time spent driving around, he came upon two teenage girls exiting a bookstore: Stacy Ann Redican and Karen Chipman-Twiggs, both 17-years-old. On the pretext of smoking some marijuana, Charlene approached the two females and invited them to travel with her in the van. She led the girls back to the van after they enthusiastically concurred. Gerald met the girls with a .357 Magnum pistol as they entered the back of the van. He quickly commanded Charlene to drive and ordered the girls to undress. Gerald took turns raping and sexually assaulting them. 

After he finished, he again had Charlene drive to a secluded area and led the girls one at a time into the woods carrying a hammer and a shovel. However, this time he forced Charlene to view the graves. She claimed that she saw movement but Gerald insisted that both girls were dead. They then left. On July 27, 1980, picnickers discovered the coyote-ravaged remains of Karen and Stacy in two shallow graves in an area twenty miles outside of Lovelock, Nevada. They had both been raped, and suffered massive and fatal head injuries by a blunt instrument.

Linda Teresa Aguilar 
While hitchhiking on June 6, 1980, in Port Orford, Oregon, 21-year-old Linda Teresa Aguila was abducted, murdered with a blunt object, and buried in a shallow grave, outside of Gold Beach, Oregon. Aguila had accepted the Gallegos' offer of a ride and was travelling with them in their van until Gerald threatened Aguilar with a .357 calibre revolver while Charlene was driving. Aguilar was four months pregnant and relatives reported her missing on June 20. German tourists found her body two days later. The victim's wrists and ankles were bound with nylon cord, and her skull was broken, but an examination revealed that she had been buried alive since sand had been found in her mouth, throat, and nose.

Virginia Mochel 
On July 17, 1980, 31-year-old Virginia Mochel was abducted from the parking lot of a West Sacramento tavern, where she worked as a bartender. Gerald and Charlene were acquainted with Mochel and had frequently been served drinks by her. Virginia was sexually assaulted by Gerald, who then forced her to beg for her life. After killing her by strangulation, he discarded her body by a pond. Her skeletal remains, still bound with nylon fishing line, were found three months later outside of Clarksburg. Loops of cord from the victim's neck were admitted as proof of death by strangulation.

Craig Miller and Mary Elizabeth Sowers 
While leaving a fraternity party on November 1, 1980, 22-year-old Craig Miller and his fiancée, 21-year-old Mary Elizabeth Sowers, were forced into the Gallegos’ car. Miller and Sowers were seen by the Gallegos' standing by the side of the road. Gerald then ordered the two to get into the automobile after getting out of the vehicle and approaching them directly whilst brandishing a .25 caliber Beretta. 

After taking them to a remote location, Gerald ordered Craig out of the car. As he turned to approach the front of the car, Gerald pointed his pistol at Miller and shot him in the back of the head while his fiancée watched. Gerald then fired two more shots into Craig’s head, as he lay lifeless on the ground; his body would later be found near Bass Lake, California. Gerald got back into the vehicle and ordered Charlene to drive to their apartment. Once back at the apartment, Gerald took Sowers into the bedroom and raped her for hours. Afterward, he ordered Charlene to drive to a rural area in Placer County, California. Once there, Gerald ordered Mary out of the car. He then shot her three times at point blank range.

Capture and trial 
A friend of Miller and Sowers witnessed their abduction and reported the car's license plate number. Police used this information to track down and arrest the Gallegos at a Western Union office. Charlene's parents were in the process of wiring her money. Gerald and Charlene pleaded not guilty to charges of kidnapping and murder. Charlene's attorneys were eventually able to convince prosecutors in several states/counties to allow Charlene to testify against Gerald for a plea deal that reduced her prison sentence to 16 years and eight months.

In June 1983 Gerald was sentenced to death in California for the murders of Mary Beth Sowers and Craig Miller. In June 1984 Gerald was convicted in Nevada for the murders of Karen Twiggs and Stacey Redican, and subsequently sentenced to death. The Nevada death sentence was overturned in 1997.

In July 1997, Charlene completed her sentence and was released. While in prison, she extensively studied psychology, business and Icelandic literature. During an interview, Charlene claimed that she was also a victim when she said, "There were victims who died, and there were victims who lived. It's taken me a hell of a long time to realize that I'm one of the ones who lived." She also claimed that she "tried to save some of their lives." In 2002, Gallego died of cancer in a Nevada prison medical center while awaiting execution.

See also 
 List of serial killers in the United States
 List of serial killers by number of victims

References

Further reading

External links 
Crime Library
Frances Farmers Revenge - Gallego

1978 murders in the United States
20th-century American criminals
American female serial killers
American kidnappers
American murderers of children
American people convicted of murder
American rapists
American serial killers
Criminal duos
Criminals from California
Male serial killers
Married couples
People convicted of murder by California
People convicted of murder by Nevada
People from Sacramento, California
Violence against women in the United States